Saint Abundantia (died 804) was a Christian saint. Her feast day is 19 January.

Life
She was born at Spoleto, and was educated by Majolus of Cluny. She later made a pilgrimage to Jerusalem with her mother. She would go on to spend five years in the cave of Onuphrius in the desert of Upper Egypt.

She is said to have cultivated devotion in honor of Raphael.

She returned to Spoleto, where she died in 804.

The story of her life has been challenged, and is considered by at least some as unreliable.

Notes and references

Holweck, F. G., A Biographical Dictionary of the Saints. St. Louis, MO: B. Herder Book Co. 1924.

Year of birth missing
804 deaths
8th-century Christian saints
People from Spoleto
Medieval Italian saints
Female saints of medieval Italy
8th-century Italian women
8th-century Italian people